Ho-Ho-Kus Brook is a tributary of the Saddle River (which is itself a tributary of the Passaic River) in Bergen County, New Jersey, in the United States.

The brook originates in Mahwah.

Ho-Ho-Kus Brook joins the Saddle River at the Dunkerhook area of Saddle River County Park. Their confluence marks the border of four Bergen County communities: Ridgewood, Paramus, Glen Rock and Fair Lawn.

While it flows it marks the border between  Mahwah and Wyckoff.

Communities
These are the communities that the Ho-Ho-Kus Brook passes along:
 Mahwah
 Franklin Lakes
 Wyckoff
 Allendale
 Waldwick
 Ho-Ho-Kus
 Ridgewood
 Glen Rock

See also
List of rivers of New Jersey

References

External links
 U.S. Geological Survey: NJ stream gaging stations

Rivers of Bergen County, New Jersey
Tributaries of the Passaic River
Rivers of New Jersey